The Empire Club of Canada is a Canadian speakers' forum. Established in 1903, the Empire Club has provided a forum for many thousands of different speakers.

Through a variety of presentation formats, the Empire Club invites local, national and international leaders and other change-agents to address the topical, relevant issues of the day. The club is based in Toronto, Ontario, with luncheon-style meetings held at several different downtown hotel and meeting spaces. It pivoted to virtual meetings due to health and safety concerns when the Corona Virus broke out in early 2020.

History 
The Empire Club of Canada was established in 1903 as a result of a political discussion which created considerable unrest in Canada. Growing dissent against the British was influencing Toronto's political and social landscape. In an attempt to refrain from a severing of ties with the British Empire, a group of men under the leadership of Brig.-Gen. James Mason discussed the creation of an organization that would promote public discourse and discussion about key issues of the day, both at home and abroad.

With this mandate in mind, the group gathered to draft the constitution for a new club to be named The Empire Club of Canada.  Canada's "Imperial bond" with Britain was the cornerstone of the Empire Club of Canada, as its founders believed it would be beneficial to Canada to maintain strong political and economic ties with the Empire. This organization, with a plan of weekly luncheons, which would be addressed by prominent individuals who spoke with authority on the issues of the day, would also have the distinctive basis of the British connection in its work and policy. Membership was restricted to British subjects—there was no legal Canadian citizenship at the time—who would pay dues of one dollar a year, with a maximum membership of 500. Within a month, membership exceeded 300. A year or two later, the club had a waiting list of those wishing to join.

The first luncheon speaker on December 3, 1903, was a clergyman and professor, William Clark, who said: "I can quite understand that to many persons, the formation of a club of this kind will seem a very little thing, ... I have not the least doubt that this Club will become of great influence and power in this Dominion". Clark's address became the first of many, with the Empire Club's podium hosting countless great leaders of politics, business, social issues and arts & culture. 

Since its inaugural meeting in December 1903, the Empire Club of Canada has provided a forum to discuss ongoing issues of local, national and international importance. More than 3,500 addresses have been delivered from the Empire Club podium, and every address is kept on record in the Empire Club of Canada's annual Red Book.

Notable speakers 

Some highly notable speakers who have addressed the Empire Club podium have included:

 Indira Gandhi
 Brian Mulroney
 The Dalai Lama
 Margaret Thatcher
 Bill Gates
 Audrey Hepburn
 John Diefenbaker
 Ronald Reagan
 Margaret Mead
 Prince Philip
 Winston Churchill
 Billy Graham
 Chrystia Freeland
 Pierre Trudeau
 Grey Owl
 Henry N.R. Jackman
 Jean Chrétien
 Hilary Weston
 Maureen Forrester
 Roberta Bondar
 Adrienne Clarkson
 Paul Martin
 Stephen Harper
 Michael Ignatieff
 Mark Carney
 Christopher Plummer
 Gordon Pinsent
 Beverley McLachlin
 Kyle Dubas 
 Bobby Webster

The Empire Club Foundation 

The Empire Club Foundation was incorporated in January 1969 and serves as a vehicle for the publication and wide-distribution of the Club's speeches. Copies are sent to a large distribution of schools, libraries, consulates and embassies.

Registered as a charity, its objectives are to promote the interest in current and public affairs, and to establish a historical database of all Empire Club speeches. All of the Empire Club speeches since 1903 are available via the Empire Club's website. In 2021, Dr. Gordon McIvor, Past President of the Empire Club of Canada, was appointed as the Chair of the Empire Club Foundation (gordonmcivor.ca).

List of club presidents 

The following people have served as president of the Empire Club:

References

External links 
 

Public speaking organizations
Clubs and societies based in Toronto
1903 establishments in Ontario
Culture of Toronto